To the Green Fields Beyond may refer to:
 To the Green Fields Beyond (play), 2000 play by Nick Whitby
 To the Green Fields Beyond (game), game by Simulations Productions